Still Climbing, also known as Still Climbing!, is the twelfth studio album by American hard rock artist, Leslie West, released in 2013. Leslie West is a founding member of the band Mountain.
The album reached #198 on the Billboard 200, making it West's third album (as well as the first since 1975) to make it on the chart (as a solo artist). The album featured performances by Johnny Lang, Dylan Rose, Dee Snider, Mark Tremonti, and Johnny Winter.
  
The title of the album is in reference to Mountain's first album, Climbing!

The track "Long Red" was first featured on West's debut solo album, Mountain, released in 1969. The rerecorded version on Still Climbing features his brother Larry West on bass. The brothers first recorded together as members of The Vagrants in the 1960s.

Track listing

Chart performance

References

Leslie West albums
2013 albums